The thick disk is one of the structural components of about 2/3 of all disk galaxies, including the Milky Way. It was discovered first in external edge-on galaxies. Soon after, it was proposed as a unique galactic structure in the Milky Way, different from the thin disk and the halo in the 1983 article by Gilmore & Reid. Its stellar chemistry and stellar kinematics (composition and motion of it stars) are also said to set it apart from the thin disk. Compared to the thin disk, thick disk stars typically have significantly lower levels of metals—that is, the abundance of elements other than hydrogen and helium.

The thick disk is a source of early kinematic and chemical evidence for a galaxy's composition and thus is regarded as a very significant component for understanding galaxy formation.

With the availability of observations at larger distances away from the Sun, more recently it has become apparent that the Milky Way thick disk does not have the same chemical and age composition at all galactic radii. It was found instead that it is metal poor inside the solar radius, but becomes more metal rich outside it. Additionally, recent observations have revealed that the average stellar age of thick disk stars quickly decreases as one moves from the inner to the outer disk.

Origin
It was shown that there is a diversity of thick disc formation scenarios. In general, various scenarios for the formation of this structure have been proposed, including:
 Thick disks come from the heating of the thin disk
 It is a result of a merger event between the Milky Way and a massive dwarf galaxy
 More energetic stars migrate outwards from the inner galaxy to form a thick disk at larger radii
 The disk forms thick at high redshift with the thin disk forming later
 Disk flaring combined with inside-out disk formation
 Scattering by massive clumps: stars born in massive gas clumps tend to be scattered to a thick disc and to be enriched in alpha-elements, while those formed out of these clumps form a thin disc and are alpha-poor

Dispute
Although the thick disk is mentioned as a bona fide galactic structure in numerous scientific studies and it's even thought to be a common component of disk galaxies in general, its nature is still under dispute.

The view of the thick disk as a single separate component has been questioned by a series of papers that describe the galactic disk with a continuous spectrum of components with different thicknesses.

See also
 Disk galaxy
 Galactic coordinate system
 Galaxy formation and evolution

 Galaxy parts
 Galactic bulge
 Galactic halo
 Spiral arm
 Thin disk

References

External links 
 Thin and Thick Galactic Disks
 Structure and Evolution of the Milky Way
 Populations & Components of the Milky Way

Galaxies